Fountains Abbey and Studley Royal Water Gardens is a World Heritage Site in North Yorkshire. It was purchased by the National Trust in 1983. The  site compromises of: 

 Studley Royal Park
 Fountains Abbey
 Fountains Hall

References

External links 

 Official website

National Trust properties in North Yorkshire